Borrello Island is a small Antarctic island lying off the western side of Hollin Island, in the Windmill Islands. It was first mapped from air photos taken by USN Operation Highjump and Operation Windmill in 1946 and 1947. Named by the US-ACAN for Sebastian R. Borrello, geomagnetician at Wilkes Station in 1958.

See also 
 Composite Antarctic Gazetteer
 List of Antarctic and sub-Antarctic islands
 List of Antarctic islands south of 60° S
 SCAR
 Territorial claims in Antarctica

References

Windmill Islands